The 1982 Pro Bowl was the NFL's 32nd annual all-star game which featured the outstanding performers from the 1981 season. The game was played on Sunday, January 31, 1982, at Aloha Stadium in Honolulu, Hawaii, in front of a crowd of 49,521. The final score was AFC 16, NFC 13.

Don Shula of the Miami Dolphins led the AFC team against an NFC team coached by Tampa Bay Buccaneers head coach John McKay. The referee was Red Cashion.

The NFC gained a 13–13 tie with 2:43 to go when Tony Dorsett ran four yards for a touchdown. In the drive to the game-winning field goal, Dan Fouts completed 3 passes, including a 23-yarder to Kellen Winslow that put the ball on the NFC's 5-yard line to set up a 23-yard game winning field goal by Nick Lowery to earn AFC a victory.

Kellen Winslow of the San Diego Chargers and Lee Roy Selmon of the Tampa Bay Buccaneers were named the game's Most Valuable Players. The referee was Red Cashion.

Players on the winning AFC team received $5,000 apiece while the NFC participants each took home $2,500. The total number of tickets sold for the game was 50,402 which set a new ticket sales record for Aloha Stadium.

AFC roster

Offense

Defense

Special teams

NFC roster

Offense

Defense

Special teams

References

External links

 

Pro Bowl
Pro Bowl
Pro Bowl
Pro Bowl
Pro Bowl
American football competitions in Honolulu
January 1982 sports events in the United States